The Fernheim Colony is a Plautdietsch-speaking settlement of Mennonites originally from Russia of about 5000 in the Chaco of Paraguay.  Mennonites from the Soviet Union founded it between 1930 and 1932. Filadelfia is the administrative center of the colony, seat of Boquerón department and is considered the 'Capital of the Chaco'.   
 
In the late 1920s, some Mennonite refugees tried to escape persecution of "Kulaks" in Stalinist Russia, which meant the total  destruction of the Mennonite religious and cultural life. They left their home villages and gathered in Moscow. For humanitarian reasons they were admitted into Germany, because they were believed to have German ethnicity, though most would be more accurately described as Dutch.  Because there was no place in Germany where they could settle together as a community, they moved to Paraguay a year later. There already was a large settlements of Mennonites with the same Russian Mennonite background in Paraguay: Menno Colony. This first Mennonite settlement in the Chaco was founded by conservative Chortitza, Sommerfeld and Bergthal Mennonites from Canada in the 1920s. The Mennonite refugees from the Soviet Union settled nearby, founding Fernheim Colony.

The journey to Paraguay was extremely difficult. Their destination, set aside by Paraguayan government decree, was completely undeveloped. From there it was a few more long days of travel by oxcart to their settlement area. It was not until 1956 that the construction of the trans-Chaco highway connecting Asunción to Filadelfia was started.

The economic base of Fernheim is agriculture and processing of agricultural products. The most important products are cotton, peanuts, beef, milk and dairy products.

Fernheim is the second Mennonite colony in Paraguay, after Menno Colony.

Further reading
 Heinrich Duerksen (Hrsg.): 50 Jahre Kolonie Fernheim. Ein Beitrag in der Entwicklung Paraguays, Filadelfia, Kolonie Fernheim, 1980
 Kai Rohkohl: Die plautdietsche Sprachinsel Fernheim, Chaco (Paraguay), Elwert, Marburg, 1993,

References

External links
 Filadelfia (Fernheim Colony, Boquerón Department, Paraguay) at Global Anabaptist Mennonite Encyclopedia Online

Populated places in the Boquerón Department

Mennonitism in Paraguay
1930 establishments in Paraguay
Russian Mennonite diaspora in South America